Andreas Ertl (born 30 September 1975) is a German alpine skiing coach and former alpine skier who won a gold medal with the national team at the team event at the 2005 Alpine World Ski Championships.

He participates at six editions of the Alpine Ski World Championships from 1996 to 2005.

Biography
Andreas Ertl is the brother of the German alpine ski champion Martina Ertl.

See also
 List of alpine skiing world champions

References

External links
 

1975 births
Living people
German male alpine skiers
German sports coaches
Sportspeople from Upper Bavaria
People from Bad Tölz-Wolfratshausen